Kamila Shamsie FRSL (born 13 August 1973) is a Pakistani and British writer and novelist who is best known for her award-winning novel Home Fire (2017). Named on Granta magazine's list of 20 best young British writers, Shamsie has been described by The New Indian Express as "a novelist to reckon with and to look forward to." She also writes for publications including The Guardian, New Statesman, Index on Censorship and Prospect, and broadcasts on radio.

Early life and education
Shamsie was born into a well-to-do family of intellectuals in Karachi, Pakistan. Her mother is journalist and editor Muneeza Shamsie, her great-aunt was writer Attia Hosain and she is the granddaughter of memoirist Jahanara Habibullah.

Shamsie was brought up in Karachi, where she attended Karachi Grammar School. She went to the US as a college exchange student, and earned a BA in creative writing from Hamilton College, and an MFA from the MFA Program for Poets & Writers at the University of Massachusetts Amherst, where she was influenced by the Kashmiri poet Agha Shahid Ali.

Career
Shamsie wrote her first novel, In The City by the Sea, while still in college, and it was published in 1998 when she was 25. It was shortlisted for the John Llewellyn Rhys Prize in the UK, and Shamsie received the Prime Minister's Award for Literature in Pakistan in 1999. Her second novel, Salt and Saffron, followed in 2000, after which she was selected as one of Orange's 21 Writers of the 21st century. Her third novel, Kartography (2002), received widespread critical acclaim and was also shortlisted for the John Llewellyn Rhys Prize in the UK. According to the review in Publishers Weekly: "Shamsie's cerebral, playful style sets her apart from most of her fellow subcontinental writers. Something of a cross between Arundhati Roy and Salman Rushdie, she deserves a larger readership in the U.S." Both Kartography and Shamsie's next novel, Broken Verses (2005), have won the Patras Bokhari Award from the Academy of Letters in Pakistan. 

Shamsie's fifth novel, Burnt Shadows (2009), was shortlisted for the Orange Prize for Fiction and won an Anisfield-Wolf Book Award for fiction. A God in Every Stone (2014) was shortlisted for the 2015 Walter Scott Prize and for the Baileys Women's Prize For Fiction. According to Maya Jaggi's review in The Guardian: "Through its succession of seemingly disparate, acutely observed worlds, Burnt Shadows reveals the impact of shared histories, hinting at larger tragedies through individual loss." Shamsie's seventh novel, Home Fire, described by the BBC as a "powerful story of the complexities of love, family and state in wartime", was longlisted for the 2017 Booker Prize, shortlisted for the International IMPAC Dublin Literary Award, and in 2018 won the Women's Prize for Fiction. 

She is also the author of the non-fiction work Offence: The Muslim Case (Seagull Books, 2009). In 2009, Shamsie donated the short story "The Desert Torso" to Oxfam's Ox-Tales project – four collections of UK stories written by 38 authors. Her story was published in the Air collection. She attended the 2011 Jaipur Literature Festival, where she spoke about her style of writing. She participated in the Bush Theatre's 2011 project Sixty-Six Books, with a piece based on a book of the King James Bible.

Shamsie was elected a Fellow of the Royal Society of Literature in 2011. In 2013, she was included in the Granta list of 20 best young British writers.

She has contributed to such international events as the Cleveland Humanities Festival and the NGC Bocas Lit Fest in Trinidad, in 2016, and she is a patron of the Manchester Literature Festival. In 2017, she joined the Manchester Centre for New Writing, where she is Professor of Creative Writing.

She delivered the 2018 Orwell Lecture at University College London, with the title "Unbecoming British: citizenship, migration and the transformation of rights into privileges".

In 2021, Shamsie was a judge for the Goldsmiths Prize, alongside Nell Stevens, Fred D'Aguiar and Johanna Thomas-Corr.

Personal life
Shamsie states that she considers herself Muslim. She moved to London in 2007 and is now a dual national of the UK and Pakistan.

In 2012, she joined the latest incarnation of the Authors XI cricket team, despite never having played the game before. She contributed a chapter, "The Women's XI", to the book The Authors XI: A Season of English Cricket from Hackney to Hambledon (2013), collectively written by members of the team to chronicle their first season together.

Awards and recognition
 1999: Prime Minister's Award for Literature in Pakistan, for In the City by the Sea
 2002: Patras Bokhari Award from the Academy of Letters in Pakistan, for Patras Bokhari Award from the Academy of Letters in Pakistan
 2005: Patras Bokhari Award, for Broken Verses
 2010: Anisfield-Wolf Book Award for fiction, for Burnt Shadows
 2013: Recognized as one of the BBC's 100 women.
 2013: Named on Grantas list of 20 best young British writers
 2018: Women's Prize for Fiction, for Home Fire
 2019: Nelly Sachs Prize (rescinded, no new winner nominated), in honour of her literary work; however, the jury withdrew its decision to award the writer citing her support for the pro-Palestinian Boycott, Divestment and Sanctions (BDS) movement. A letter protesting the move was signed by hundreds of fellow writers in support of Shamsie.

Books 
 In the City by the Sea (1998), 
 Salt and Saffron (2000), 
 Kartography (2002), 
 Broken Verses (2005), 
 Offence: The Muslim Case (2009), 
 Burnt Shadows (2009), 
 A God in Every Stone (2014), 
 Home Fire (2017), 
 Best of Friends (2022),

See also 
 List of people who support the BDS movement

References

Further reading

External links

 Kamila Shamsie talks about Burnt Shadows on the BBC's World Book Club
 Kamila Shamsie at Bloomsbury Publishing
 Article in The Guardian on Kamila Shamsie
 "The Storytellers of Empire" in Guernica, 1 February 2012
 Article on the London of Kamila Shamsie's Home Fire on the London Fictions website
 "Kamila Shamsie: Home Fire". Shamsien conversation with Sonia Nair at the Wheeler Centre.
 "Books by Kamila Shamsie and Complete Book Reviews", Publishers Weekly.
 Alison Flood, "Hundreds of authors protest after Kamila Shamsie's book award is revoked", The Guardian, 23 September 2019.

1973 births
21st-century British women writers
BBC 100 Women
British Muslims
British women novelists
British writers of Pakistani descent
English-language writers from Pakistan
Fellows of the Royal Society of Literature
Hamilton College (New York) alumni
Karachi Grammar School alumni
Living people
Naturalised citizens of the United Kingdom
Pakistani emigrants to the United Kingdom
Pakistani novelists
Pakistani women novelists
University of Massachusetts Amherst MFA Program for Poets & Writers alumni
Writers from Karachi
20th-century Pakistani women writers
21st-century British novelists